K. Manikandan is an Indian film writer, actor and director who works in the Tamil film industry.

Career 
Manikandan participated in a popular reality comedy show and finished as the runner-up of the season. Subsequently, he joined an FM channel as a Radio Jockey while also dubbing/voice acting for several films and TV shows.

He debuted as a writer with Pizza II: Villa (2013). He made his acting debut with India Pakistan (2015) and played a minor role in the   Kadhalum Kadanthu Pogum (2016) directed by Nalan Kumarasamy. Manikandan then played an antagonist in Sri Ganesh's debut directorial venture 8 Thottakkal (2017) alongside M. S. Bhaskar and Lallu. He penned the dialogues for Pushkar–Gayathri's third directorial venture Vikram Vedha (2017) and also played a role of a police constable in the film. In 2018, Pa. Ranjith picked Manikandan for a role in Kaala (2018). Manikandan was involved in Viswasam (2019)  Thambi (2019), directed by Siva and Jeethu Joseph respectively, as a dialogue writer. He paired with Nivedithaa Sathish in the romantic anthology film Sillu Karupatti (2019), directed by Halitha Shameem. Manikandan received critical acclaim for his role in the film, Aelay (2021).

Manikandan directed an independent film ‘Narai Ezhuthum Suyasaritham’ (English Title: Endless) starring Delhi Ganesh and himself. The film was selected to participate in Bengaluru International Film Festival (2016) under ‘Indian Cinema Competition’. Endless was one of the four films to be selected for screening at 16th New York Indian Film Festival (2016).

Filmography

References

External links
 

Tamil-language writers
Tamil writers
Screenwriters from Tamil Nadu
Tamil screenwriters
Living people
Indian male film actors
Male actors in Tamil cinema
1983 births